The European Fencing Championships is an annual top-level European fencing competition organized by the European Fencing Confederation.

History
The first competition bearing the name of "European Fencing Championships" was held in Paris in 1921. The International Fencing Federation (FIE) comprised only European federations at the time, with the exception of the United States. In 1936, on the 25th anniversary of the FIE and at the request of the Italian federation, the FIE congress decided to open the European Championships to all countries and granted retroactive recognition of the European Championships as World Championships.

After 1937 the FIE focused on the organisation of the World Fencing Championships. Demand for European Championships appeared at the 1979 congress, but it was rejected on the ground that they would either belittle the World Championships or offer a poor fencing level. The question was put forth again the following year by the Yugoslav federation, with the support of the Italian federation, which offered to organize the first competition. The congress agreed to authorize such championships, on the condition that they would be held only when the World Championships were organized in a non-European country. The first edition took place in Foggia, Italy on 11 and 12 November 1981. They proved to cause no interference with the 1981 World Championships and the restriction was lifted.

Formula
Contrary to the World Championships and the World Cup, no exemption is granted to Top 16 fencers: all fence a round of pools, which eliminates 20% to 30% of participants. The remaining fencers compete in a direct elimination table.

Editions

Medal table
Updated after the 2022 European Fencing Championships.

See also
 Fencing at the Summer Olympics
 World Fencing Championships
 other zone championships: African Fencing Championships, Asian Fencing Championships, Pan American Fencing Championships

References

External links

 European Fencing Confederation (EFC), official site

 
Fencing competitions
European championships
Fencing competitions in Europe